A shtiebel ( shtibl, pl. shtiblekh or shtiebels, meaning "little house" or "little room" cognate with German Stübel) is a place used for communal Jewish prayer. In contrast to a formal synagogue, a shtiebel is far smaller and approached more casually. It is typically as small as a room in a private home or a place of business which is set aside for the express purpose of prayer, or it may be as large as a small-sized synagogue. It may or may not offer the communal services of a synagogue.

Traditional shtiebels are not only a place for prayer, but also a place for community gathering. Due to the prominence of a Hasidic rebbe, the shtiebel served as a medium for being near to him. A shtiebel would be host to the Seudah Shlishit, the ritual third meal of the Sabbath. The shtiebel attracted newcomers through the inviting atmosphere it created by allowing prayer, eating, drinking, and community activities.

Shtiebels were common in Jewish communities in Eastern Europe before the Holocaust. The shtiebel was distinctly characteristic of Hasidic Judaism and played a central and critical role in the life of the Hasidim. It continues to exist in contemporary Israel and the United States.

The shtiebel was cost effective and assisted in the spread of Hasidism through a grassroots movement where individuals previously exposed to Hasidism could establish one in their local community. This characteristic of the shtiebel allowed for Hasidism to reach more communities on the local and regional level throughout the 18th and 19th Century.
 
In Israel, minyans are held in storefront shtiebelekh in major business areas around the clock; whenever ten men show up, a new minyan begins. The Zichron Moshe shtiebel in the Zikhron Moshe neighborhood of Jerusalem (near Geula) is located in a proper synagogue, with many rooms for round-the-clock minyans. This shtiebel is well known as the locale of Friday-night mussar talks which Rabbi Sholom Schwadron, the "Maggid of Jerusalem," delivered for more than 40 years.

Shtiblach in its current meaning 
In the ultra-Orthodox community in Israel, synagogues developed in which a number of rooms were concentrated (hence Shtieblach - plural in Yiddish for shtibel) to prayer minyanim. The purpose of the shtiblach is to allow a parallel prayer place and a more liberated atmosphere. Unlike a synagogue in which there are regular prayer times, certain seating arrangements, and the like, the Shtiblach operates at all hours of the day and routinely includes temporary worshipers.

Famous Shtiblach in Israel
Itzkovitch – Bnei Brak

References

Haredi Judaism
Synagogues
Yiddish words and phrases